Frank Bissett Garden (March 4, 1933 – October 13, 2007) was a Canadian politician. He served in the Legislative Assembly of British Columbia from 1987 to 1991, as a NDP member for the constituency of Cariboo North. Prior to his election, he was a bricklayer. He died in 2007 from colon cancer.

References

British Columbia New Democratic Party MLAs
1933 births
2007 deaths